This is a list of United Nations Security Council Resolutions 2401 to 2500 adopted between 24 February 2018 and 4 December 2019.

See also 
 Lists of United Nations Security Council resolutions
 List of United Nations Security Council Resolutions 2301 to 2400
 List of United Nations Security Council Resolutions 2501 to 2600

References 

2401